Green Chemistry Letters and Reviews is a peer-reviewed scientific journal published quarterly by Taylor & Francis. It publishes full papers and review articles on new syntheses and green chemistry.

External links
 

Chemistry journals
Green chemistry
Taylor & Francis academic journals
Quarterly journals
English-language journals
Publications established in 2007